Sky Rocket II is a steel roller coaster model made by American manufacturer Premier Rides. The first Sky Rocket II was Superman: Ultimate Flight at Six Flags Discovery Kingdom, which opened on June 30, 2012, and the latest is Sky Loop at Riyadh Winter Wonderland in 2022. The ride has been noted for its low-cost and small foot-print.

History 
The production for the Sky Rocket II model began in with its announcement in 2011 with the introduction of Superman: Ultimate Flight for Six Flags Discovery Kingdom. Originally for the prototype model, there would be two cars with two riders per row with three rows in total, though expandable for other consumers. The model for Six Flags opened on June 30, 2012. Tempesto at Busch Gardens Williamsburg introduced the model using three cars in 2015.

Design
It is followed by an inline twist, the exit of which leads to a downward dive, which initiates the passage of the non-inverting loop. In the station, the trains are then brought to a halt.

Zombie Ride at Bosque Mágico is the currently the only Sky Rocket II coaster with a sliding loading platform allowing two train operations. One train is slid into the circuit while the other train is loading at the platform. It is also the only Sky Rocket II to complete two full laps of the circuit. Zombie Ride uses 12 passenger trains like Superman: Ultimate Flight.

Installations
Premier Rides has built ten Sky Rocket II coasters. These are listed by order of opening.

References

External links 

 

Amusement ride models by name
Roller coasters manufactured by Premier Rides
Types of roller coaster